Loraine (formerly, Paris and Paris-Loraine) is an unincorporated community in Kern County, California.

The Paris post office opened in 1903, changed its name to Loraine in 1912, closed in 1918, re-opened in 1922, and closed for good in 1926.  The place was originally settled by French and Alsatian miners.

References

Mining communities in California
Unincorporated communities in Kern County, California
Unincorporated communities in California